Bulin  is a village in the administrative district of Gmina Kożuchów, within Nowa Sól County, Lubusz Voivodeship, in western Poland.

The village has a population of 31.

References

Bulin